Engelland is a surname. Notable people with the surname include:

 Deryk Engelland (born 1982), Canadian ice hockey player
 Chip Engelland (born 1961), American-Filipino basketball player and coach
 Chad Engelland, American philosopher